De Hoef is the name of several locations in the Netherlands:

 De Hoef, Utrecht, in the municipality of De Ronde Venen

In North Brabant:
 De Hoef, Altena, in the municipality of Altena
 De Hoef, Eersel, in the municipality of Eersel
 De Hoef, Mill en Sint Hubert, in the municipality of Mill en Sint Hubert
 De Hoef, Reusel-De Mierden, in the municipality of Reusel-De Mierden
 De Hoef, Someren, in the municipality of Someren